Social Sciences Literature Press (traditional Chinese: 社會科學文獻出版社; simplified Chinese: 社会科学文献出版社), also spelled as Social Sciences Literature Publishing House or China Social Sciences Literature Publishing House,  commonly known as Social Sciences Academic Press, abbreviated as SSAP,  is an academic publishing organization for humanities and social sciences,  directly under the leadership of the Chinese Academy of Social Sciences.

Social Sciences Academic Press was established in 1985, whose notable publications are the "Yearbook series". The scope of its publications mainly includes works on foreign Marxist studies and social science theories, world culture, academic trends, academic figures, schools of thought, conferences, research institutions, as well as related literature and various tools.

References 

Chinese Academy of Social Sciences
Publishing organizations
1985 establishments in China